Hans-Christian Schmid (born 1965) is a German film director and screenwriter.

Life and work
Gutmann wrote screenplays for 23 — Nichts ist so wie es scheint (1998), and Crazy (2000). Gutmann also directed  (2001) for which he and Schmid wrote the screenplay.

Awards
 1995: Findling Award for Himmel und Hölle
 2003: Bavarian Film Award, Best Screenplay 
 2003: Findling Award for Lichter

Filmography
 Sekt oder Selters (1989)
 Die Mechanik des Wunders (1992)
 Himmel und Hölle (1994)
 After Five in the Forest Primeval (Nach Fünf im Urwald) (1995)
 23 — Nichts ist so wie es scheint (1998)
 Crazy (2000)
 Distant Lights (Lichter) (2003)
 Requiem (2006)
 Storm (Sturm) (2009)
 Home for the Weekend (Was bleibt) (2012)
 Das Verschwinden (2016/17)
 We Are Next of Kin (2022)

References

External links
 
 Hans-Christan Schmid on filmportal.de (English)
 235 film production website

1965 births
Living people
Film people from Bavaria
English-language film directors
Members of the Academy of Arts, Berlin
People from Altötting